Code page 1006 (CCSID 1006), also known as ISO 8-bit Urdu, is used by IBM in its AIX operating system in Pakistan for Urdu.

Codepage layout

References

1006